This is a list of educational institutions located in the district of Dera Ghazi Khan in Pakistan.

Primary and secondary educational institutions & Colleges
Ghazi University
Allied Schools, a project of Punjab Group of Colleges
The Educators
ILM Group of Colleges
Ghazi Khan Medical College
New Al Zahra Public Model School Peer Muhammad Ghaouri

External links

Lists of universities and colleges in Pakistan
Dera Ghazi Khan District